The Hanna's Town Resolves were one of the most direct challenges to British authority in their North American colonies preceding the Declaration of Independence and the American Revolutionary War. Before most other colonial communities took a stand, Westmoreland County, Pennsylvania residents proclaimed their willingness to take drastic measures to maintain and defend their rights against British oppression.

History

On May 16, 1775, settlers in the far west of Pennsylvania, along with Arthur St. Clair (The Penn government’s local representative) gathered at the tavern, which was also serving as the courthouse, in Hanna's Town (or Hannastown near present-day Greensburg, Pennsylvania) and affixed their names to the Hanna's Town Resolves agreeing to bind themselves together and to take up arms if necessary to resist further "tyrannical" acts of Parliament. More than a year later, the Declaration of Independence would be signed in Philadelphia, Pennsylvania.  This was the first such declaration in any of the British colonies, occurring a few weeks before the Mecklenburg Resolves in North Carolina.

This seemingly drastic action was due largely to the composition of the local population of this then frontier wilderness region.  "In the main they were the landless, the disinherited and the disenfranchised. They were bold, aggressive, hardy, courageous and self-reliant.  They often had little respect for authority or title. Having experienced arbitrary and capricious government in England, they were zealous defenders of personal liberty and self-government".

Hanna's Town, founded in 1773 and named for its founder Robert Hanna, who signed the Hanna's Town Resolves, acted as the first seat of Westmoreland County, Pennsylvania and the first English court west of the Alleghany Mountains.  Seven years after the signing of the Resolves, British troops and their Native American allies burned Hanna's Town to the ground in one of the last actions of the American Revolutionary War.  The town was never to recover.  Its site was listed on the National Register of Historic Places as the Site of Old Hannastown in 1972.

Text 

<blockquote>Resolved unanimously, That the Parliament of Great Britain, by several late acts, have declared the inhabitants of Massachusetts Bay to be in Rebellion, and the ministry, by endeavoring to enforce those acts, have attempted to reduce the said inhabitants to a more wretched state of slavery than ever before existed in any state or country. Not content with violating their constitutional and chartered privileges, they would strip them of the rights of humanity, exposing lives to the wanton and unpunishable sport of licentious soldiery, and depriving them of the very means of subsistence."
 
"Resolved unanimously, That there is no reason to doubt that the same system of tyranny and oppression will (should it meet with success in Massachusetts Bay) be extended to every other part of America: It is therefore become the indispensable duty of every American, of every man who has any public virtue or love for his country, or any bowels for posterity, by every means which God has put in his power, to resist and oppose the execution of it; that for us we will be ready to oppose it with our lives and fortunes. And the better to enable us to accomplish it, we will immediately form ourselves into a military body, to consist of companies to be made up out of the several townships under the following association, which is declared to be the Association of Westmoreland County."
"Possessed with the most unshaken loyalty and fidelity to His Majesty, King George the Third, whom we acknowledge to be our lawful and rightful King, and who we wish may long be the beloved sovereign of a free and happy people throughout the whole British Empire; we declare to the world, that we do not mean by this Association to deviate from that loyalty which we hold in our bounded duty to observe, but, animated with the love of liberty, it is no less our duty to maintain and defend our just rights (which, with sorrow, we have seen of late wantonly violated in many instances by a wicked Ministry and a corrupted Parliament) and transmit them to our posterity, for purpose which we do agree and associate together:"

"1st. To arm and form ourselves into a regiment or regiments, and choose officers to command us in such proportions as shall be thought necessary."

"2nd. We will, with alacrity, endeavor to make ourselves masters of the manual exercise, and such evolutions as may be necessary to enable us to act in a body with concert; and to that end we will meet at such times and places as shall be appointed either for the companies or the regiment, by the officers commanding each when chosen."

"3rd. That should our country be invaded by a foreign enemy, or should troops be sent from Great Britain to enforce the late arbitrary acts of its Parliament, we will cheerfully submit to military discipline, and to the utmost of our power resist and oppose them, or either of them, and will coincide with any plan that may be formed for the defense of America in general, or Pennsylvania in particular."

"4th. That we do not wish or desire any innovations, but only that things may be restored to, and go on in the same way as before the era of the Stamp Act, when Boston grew great, and America was happy. As a proof of this disposition, we will quietly submit to the laws by which we have been accustomed to be governed before that period, and will, in our general or associate capacities, be ready when called on to assist the civil magistrate in carrying the same in execution.''

"5th. That when the British Parliament shall have repealed their late obnoxious statutes, and shall recede from their claim to tax us, and make laws for us in every instance; or when some general plan of union and reconciliation has been formed and accepted by America, this our Association shall be dissolved; but till then it shall remain in full force; and to the observation of it,
we bind ourselves by everything dear and sacred amongst men." "No licensed murder: no famine introduced by law"

"Resolved that on Wednesday, the twenty-fourth instant, the township meets to accede to the said Association and choose their officer."

Adopted at a general meeting of the inhabitants of the County of Westmoreland, held at Hanna's Town the 16th day of May, 1775 for taking into consideration the very alarming situation of the country, occasioned by the dispute with Great Britain.

References 

Pennsylvania in the American Revolution
Documents of the American Revolution
History of Westmoreland County, Pennsylvania
1775 in Pennsylvania